Louis Daniel van Zyl Fouché (born 4 January 1990) is a South African rugby union player for the  in the Pro14 and the  in the Currie Cup. His regular position is fly-half.

Rugby career

2007–2010 : Youth / Leopards

Fouché was born in Pretoria and grew up in Rustenburg. In 2007, he was selected to represent the Rustenburg-based  at the 2007 Under-18 Academy Week tournament. The following year, he represented the Leopards at the premier high school rugby union tournament in South Africa, the Under-18 Craven Week held in Pretoria, starting all three of their matches at the tournament and scoring 12 points. At the conclusion of the Craven Week, he was also named in an Under-18 Elite Squad.

Fouché joined the Leopards academy after finishing high school and in 2009, he was included in their Under-19 squad that competed in the Under-19 Provincial Championship. However, after just three appearances, he was promoted to the  team. He made three appearances for them, but could not prevent them finishing bottom of Group A. However, he scored 18 points in their relegation play-off match against  to help them to a 38–27 win to retain their place in Group A of the competition.

Fouché was the undisputed first-choice fly-half for the Leopards Under-21 side in the 2010 Under-21 Provincial Championship Group A, starting eleven of their twelve matches in the competition.

2011–2013 : Blue Bulls / Bulls

Fouché's performances didn't go unnoticed by other teams and he was contracted by the Pretoria-based  prior to the 2011 season.

In July 2011, Fouché represented the  side in the 2011 Under-21 Provincial Championship. He played in their first four matches of the competition, scoring 20 points against , 22 points against , nine points against  and 28 points against trans-Jukskei rivals . He also scored his first points at this level, kicking a drop goal in the final minute of a 16–12 victory. He was promoted to the starting line-up for their next match against  and justified his selection by scoring a try, two penalties and four conversions to score 19 points in the Blue Bulls' 44–20 victory. He was the Blue Bulls' starting fly-half for the remainder of the competition, scoring a total of 126 in his nine appearances to make him the Blue Bulls' leading points scorer and joint-fifth place on the overall scoring charts. However, the Blue Bulls had a poor season and finished in fifth spot on the log, missing out on the semi-finals. With the Under-21 Provincial Championship in its play-off stage, Fouché reverted to the Under-21 side for their semi-final match against , kicking 15 points in a 47–18 victory. He was also the Blue Bulls U21s' top scorer in the final, where he kicked five conversions and two penalties to help the Blue Bulls to a 46–30 victory to win the championship. Despite missing eight matches due to his involvement with the senior side, he still finished fifth on the points-scoring charts, with 110 points in just six appearances.

In 2012, Fouché was included in the  squad for the 2012 Super Rugby season. He was the understudy to their main fly-half, Morné Steyn, throughout the competition and was named on the bench for all seventeen of their matches in the competition. With Steyn on duty with the South Africa national team, Fouché was the first choice fly-half for the Blue Bulls during the 2012 Currie Cup Premier Division. He started nine of their ten of their matches during the regular season of the competition, scoring 137 points (through 12 conversions, 35 penalties and two drop goals) to help the Blue Bulls finish in fourth position to secure the final semi-final berth. Fouché came on in the 68th minute of the semi-final, but could not prevent the hosts winning the match 20–3 to progress to the final.

However, he suffered a torn knee ligament that ruled him out of the remainder of the competition. During the Super Rugby season, he signed a contract extension to keep him at the Blue Bulls until the end of 2015.

His knee ligament injury prevented him from playing in the 2013 Currie Cup and he only returned to action during the 2014 Super Rugby season. He was dropped from the side and found him behind Jacques-Louis Potgieter and Handré Pollard in the pecking order and made no further appearances in the competition. He did play in the 2014 Vodacom Cup for the Blue Bulls, however, making four starts and scoring 32 points.

2014–2015 : Ricoh Black Rams / Return to Blue Bulls

In June 2014, the Blue Bulls allowed him to join Japanese Top League side Ricoh Black Rams on a one-year contract. He didn't have the most successful time in Japan either, making just three appearances as a replacement in 2014–15 Top League matches against Coca-Cola Red Sparks, NTT DoCoMo Red Hurricanes and Toyota Verblitz.

Fouché returned to the Blue Bulls prior to the 2015 Currie Cup Premier Division, and made eight appearances in the competition, scoring 32 points. The Blue Bulls finished in second position on the log, but lost in their semi-final match against Western Province.

2016 : Eastern Province Kings / Southern Kings

After the 2015 season, he was recruited by Port Elizabeth-based .

2016–2018 : Kubota Spears

Fouché returned to Japan for a second spell prior to the 2016–17 Top League, signing with the Kubota Spears.

References

Living people
1990 births
South African rugby union players
Rugby union fly-halves
Bulls (rugby union) players
Blue Bulls players
Afrikaner people
Rugby union players from Pretoria
Black Rams Tokyo players
South African expatriate rugby union players
Expatriate rugby union players in Japan
South African expatriate sportspeople in Japan
Southern Kings players
Kubota Spears Funabashi Tokyo Bay players
Free State Cheetahs players
Cheetahs (rugby union) players